The Kazakhstan Billie Jean King Cup team represents Kazakhstan in the Billie Jean King Cup tennis competition and are governed by the Kazakhstan Tennis Federation.  They currently compete in the Asia/Oceania Zone of Group I.

History
Kazakhstan competed in its first Fed Cup in 1995.  Their best result was qualifying for the World Group II play-offs in 2013, 2017, and 2019, losing to France, Canada, and Great Britain. In 2020, Kazakhstan faced Belgium to earn opportunity to play in the World Group. Prior to 1993, Kazakh players represented the Soviet Union.

Active players on WTA Tour
 Yulia Putintseva
 Zarina Diyas
 Gozal Ainitdinova
 Zhibek Kulambayeva
 Galina Voskoboeva
 Anna Danilina
 Elena Rybakina

External links

Billie Jean King Cup teams
Fed Cup
Tennis